The Hadley Mountain Fire Observation Station is a historic fire observation station located on Hadley Mountain at Hadley in Saratoga County, New York.  The tower is a prefabricated structure built by the Aermotor Corporation in 1917.

It is one of the initial ten towers purchased by the State Commission to provide a front line of defense in preserving the Adirondack Forest Preserve from the hazards of forest fires. The tower may be staffed in summer months by a steward who will answer questions from hikers.

It was added to the National Register of Historic Places in 2001.

Plaque
There is a plaque at the base of the trail which leads to the fire tower. The plaque states that the original wood tower was erected in 1916. The current steel tower was built in 1920.

References

External links

The Fire Towers of New York
Hadley Mountain Fire Tower

Government buildings completed in 1917
Towers completed in 1917
Government buildings on the National Register of Historic Places in New York (state)
Buildings and structures in Saratoga County, New York
Fire lookout towers in Adirondack Park
Fire lookout towers on the National Register of Historic Places in New York (state)
National Register of Historic Places in Saratoga County, New York